Ashland is a census-designated place (CDP) and unincorporated community in Alameda County, California, United States. The population was 23,823 at the 2020 census. Ashland is located between the city of San Leandro to the north, the unincorporated community of Cherryland to the south, the unincorporated community of Castro Valley to the east, and the unincorporated community of San Lorenzo to the southwest.   

Ashland shares a postal zip code with the neighboring unincorporated community of San Lorenzo to the southwest, as well as the close by cities of Hayward to the south and San Leandro to the north.
There is no documented evidence that Ashland was ever known as “San Leandro South” but instead has been informally, albeit incorrectly, known as "unincorporated San Leandro" or "unincorporated Hayward" since Ashland does not have its own postal zip code designation.

Geography

History
Ashland developed as a residential suburb in the 1940s. It was named for an Oregon ash tree.

The San Lorenzo Creek is the southern border of Ashland.

Demographics

2010
The 2010 United States Census reported that Ashland had a population of 21,925. The racial makeup of Ashland was 6,705 (30.6%) White, 4,269 (19.5%) African American, 232 (1.1%) Native American, 4,031 (18.4%) Asian, 260 (1.2%) Pacific Islander, 5,124 (23.4%) from other races, and 1,304 (5.9%) from two or more races. Hispanic or Latino of any race were 9,394 persons (42.8%).

The Census reported that 21,739 people (99.2% of the population) lived in households, 103 (0.5%) lived in non-institutionalized group quarters, and 83 (0.4%) were institutionalized.

There were 7,270 households, out of which 3,209 (44.1%) had children under the age of 18 living in them, 2,786 (38.3%) were opposite-sex married couples living together, 1,589 (21.9%) had a female householder with no husband present, 635 (8.7%) had a male householder with no wife present. There were 639 (8.8%) unmarried opposite-sex partnerships, and 54 (0.7%) same-sex married couples or partnerships. 1,713 households (23.6%) were made up of individuals, and 417 (5.7%) had someone living alone who was 65 years of age or older. The average household size was 2.99. There were 5,010 families (68.9% of all households); the average family size was 3.52.

The population was spread out, with 6,097 people (27.8%) under the age of 18, 2,317 people (10.6%) aged 18 to 24, 6,938 people (31.6%) aged 25 to 44, 4,905 people (22.4%) aged 45 to 64, and 1,668 people (7.6%) who were 65 years of age or older. The median age was 31.4 years. For every 100 females, there were 95.2 males. For every 100 females age 18 and over, there were 91.3 males.

The homeowner vacancy rate was 2.5%; the rental vacancy rate was 4.5%. 7,883 people (36.0% of the population) lived in owner-occupied housing units and 13,856 people (63.2%) lived in rental housing units.

2000
As of the census of 2000, there were 20,793 people, 7,223 households, and 4,868 families living in the CDP. The racial makeup of the CDP in 2010 was 15.6% non-Hispanic White, 18.6% non-Hispanic Black or African American, 0.4% Native American, 18.1% Asian, 1.1% Pacific Islander, 0.3% from other races, and 3.1% from two or more races. 42.8% of the population were Hispanic or Latino of any race.

There were 7,223 households, out of which 40.0% had children under the age of 18 living with them, 39.7% were married couples living together, 20.5% had a female householder with no husband present, and 32.6% were non-families. 24.3% of all households were made up of individuals, and 6.8% had someone living alone who was 65 years of age or older. The average household size was 2.83 and the average family size was 3.39.

In the CDP, the population was spread out, with 28.5% under the age of 18, 10.0% from 18 to 24, 35.1% from 25 to 44, 17.3% from 45 to 64, and 9.1% who were 65 years of age or older. The median age was 31 years. For every 100 females, there were 95.8 males. For every 100 females age 18 and over, there were 91.7 males.

The median income for a household in the CDP was $40,811, and the median income for a family was $43,202. Males had a median income of $33,943 versus $31,092 for females. The per capita income for the CDP was $18,134. About 11.9% of families and 14.3% of the population were below the poverty line, including 19.9% of those under age 18 and 11.1% of those age 65 or over.

Government 
Ashland is an unincorporated community outside the city limits of any neighboring city. Although it shares a postal zip code with a neighboring city, it does not receive any municipal services other than those provided by the county and is thus governed directly by the Alameda County Board of Supervisors and associated county agencies. 

In 2019, the Eden Area Municipal Advisory Council was created by the Alameda County Board of Supervisors in order to advise the Board of Supervisors, the Alameda County Planning Commission and the West County Board of Zoning Adjustments, on policy and decision making for the unincorporated communities of Ashland, Cherryland, San Lorenzo and Hayward Acres.

Ashland is policed by the Alameda County Sheriff's Office, Eden Township Substation, and the California Highway Patrol.

Ashland is served by the San Lorenzo Unified School District for public school services. 

Ashland is served by the Alameda County Public Works Agency for road and public infrastructure design and maintenance.  

Ashland is served by the Hayward Area Recreation and Parks District for parks and recreation.

Ashland is served by the Oro Loma Sanitary District for waste water services and the East Bay Municipal Utility District for freshwater services.

References

External links
 Ashland Chamber of Commerce
 San Lorenzo Express (local news)

Census-designated places in Alameda County, California
Populated places established in the 1940s
Census-designated places in California